Sierra Carapé or Sierra de Carapé is a hill range located in Maldonado Department, in southern Uruguay. The range crosses the Maldonado Department from west to east and enters the Rocha Department.

Local demarcation 

It constitutes the border between the departments of Lavalleja and Maldonado, in south-eastern Uruguay. This hill range constitutes part of a larger range named Cuchilla Grande.

Highest point in Uruguay

This range has the highest point of the country, the Cerro Catedral, with 513.66 metres (1,685.24 feet) of altitude.

See also
Geography of Uruguay
Cerro Catedral (Uruguay)#Location and geology

External links
 Cerro Catedral, Site of the Municipality of Maldonado, Uruguay.
  Peakbagger.com: Cerro Catedral, Uruguay

Hills of Uruguay
Landforms of Maldonado Department